Ivan Lendl was the defending champion and won in the final 6–2, 6–0 against Jimmy Connors.

Seeds

  Ivan Lendl (champion)
  Jimmy Connors (final)
  Brad Gilbert (first round)
  Johan Kriek (quarterfinals)
  Andrés Gómez (semifinals)
  Tim Mayotte (semifinals)
  Jimmy Arias (second round)
  David Pate (quarterfinals)

Draw

Finals

Top half

Bottom half

External links
 1986 Paine Webber Classic Draw

Singles